Navarro-Aragonese is a Romance language once spoken in a large part of the Ebro River basin, south of the middle Pyrenees, although it is only currently spoken in a small portion of its original territory. The areas where it was spoken might have included most of Aragón, southern Navarre, and La Rioja. It was also spoken across several towns of central Navarre in a multilingual environment with Occitan, where Basque was the native language. 

Navarro-Aragonese gradually lost ground throughout most of its geographic areas to Castilian, with its last remnants being the dialects of the Aragonese language still spoken in northern Aragon.

Origins and distribution
The language was not defined by clear-cut boundaries, but rather it was a continuum of the Romance language spoken on the stretch extending north of the Muslim realms of the Ebro, under the influence of Mozarabic and Basque, towards the Pyrenees. The Muwallad Banu Qasi, lords of Tudela in the 9th century, may have mostly spoken a variant of Navarro-Aragonese. Early evidence of the language can be found in place-names like Murillo el Fruto attested as Murello Freito and Muriel Freito (stemming from Latin "Murellus Fractus") and Cascante, Olite or Urzante with a typical restored -e ending after "t" in this area.

The language is also attested in major towns of Navarre (in Estella and Pamplona too) in a multilingual environment where Basque was the natural language, used by most of the people, Occitan was spoken by the Franks in their ethnic boroughs, while Hebrew was used for written purposes in the aljamas along with Basque and Navarro-Aragonese as vernaculars in their respective linguistic regions. 

At the westernmost tip of this middle Ebro stretch a Romance variant was developed in La Rioja, recorded in the Glosas Emilianenses dating from roughly 1000 AD. They have been diversely classified from "cradle of Spanish" to a Navarro-Aragonese variant, while it is widely accepted the glosses show more similarities with the latter. However, political events were going to tip the scale in favour of an increasing assimilation to Castilian in the following centuries, especially after the disputed region was annexed to Castile in 1177 at the expense of Navarre. Another focal point for the emergence and expansion of Romance in High Aragon and eastern border of Navarre was the ancient Roman road and Way of St. James crossing the Pyrenees to the south from Gascony and extending west via Jaca through the Corridor of Berdún, while the territory was largely Basque-Romance bilingual back in 1349.

However, early Navarro-Aragonese speaking communities may have ebbed and become assimilated in some spots on the strength of a predominant Basque-speaking population (overwhelmingly so in Navarre) north away from the Ebro plains, due to demographic, economic and political shifts, e.g. the eastern borders of Navarre in Leire, Sangüesa, Liédena, Romanzado altogether, were densely Basque-speaking in mid and late 16th century. Navarro-Aragonese had a strong Basque substratum and adstratum, the former being in close contact with Basque, which in turn was rapidly losing ground to the Romance language in the Kingdom of Aragon during the High and Late Middle Ages.

Status and written language
Navarro-Aragonese was chosen in the High Middle Ages by the Navarrese aristocracy and royal institutions for official records and documents in the 14th century when Occitan variants fell much in decay after the last devastating war among boroughs in Pamplona, dubbing it ydiomate navarre terrae or lengoage de Navarra (as opposed to the lingua navarrorum, the Basque language). Navarro-Aragonese is a modern term coined for linguistic classification purposes, while its speakers may have referred to it as "Romanz(e) (Aragonés/Navarro)" in the Middle Ages.

The language's features at this last stage in the 14th and 15th century grew closer to those of Castilian, showing a clear trend towards convergence, as attested in the telling opening sentence of Charles II of Navarre at his coronation ceremony (1350): "Nos Karlos, por la gracia de Dios, rey de Navarra et conté d'Evreux, juramos a nuestro pueblo de Navarra, es assaber, prelados, ricoshombres, cavailleros, hombres de buenas villas et a todo el pueblo de Navarra, todos lures fueros, usos, costumbres, franquezas, libertades."

Eventual development
The language merged with Castilian during the 15th and early 16th century in Navarre, while it further survived in Aragon, eventually developing into Aragonese, expanding south along with the Crown of Aragon's lands conquered to the kingdoms in Al-Andalus, and reaching at one point as far south as Murcia, while the Mediterranean coastal strip came to be settled by Catalan speakers. These geo-linguistic gains could not prevent Navarro-Aragonese from gradually losing ground to Castilian both territorially and socially after the Trastámara dynasty's access to the Aragonese crown and the 1469 wedding between Ferdinand II of Aragon and Isabella I of Castile, who favoured Castilian (Spanish) in the royal court. However, the language has lasted, while keeping a low profile and increasingly confined to the Pyrenees, up to modern days.

Vocabulary
The vocabulary below illustrates the language's Romance roots, its relationship to neighbouring languages (adstratum, and possibly also as substratum in the case of Basque), as well as meanings in English.

See also 

 History of the Basque language

References

Aragonese language
Medieval languages
Extinct languages of Spain
Extinct Romance languages
Languages extinct in the 16th century
Navarre culture
Riojan culture
Languages attested from the 11th century